Professor Emil Otto Grundmann (1844 in Meissen – 27 August 1890 in Dresden), was a German painter who studied in Antwerp under Baron Hendrik Leys, and in Düsseldorf before moving to America where he became a noted painter. He was the first Director of the School of the Museum of Fine Arts, Boston, an appointment in which Francis Davis Millet, an old Antwerp friend, was instrumental. One of his colleagues at the Museum was Joseph DeCamp.

Many notable American artists attended his classes and were influenced by his European ideas. Some students who later became prominent were Edmund C. Tarbell, Edward Clark Potter, Robert Reid, Ernest Fenollosa, Frank Weston Benson and Charles Henry Turner.

See also
 List of German painters

References

External links
Museum of Fine Arts, Boston
Meissen Street Names

1844 births
1890 deaths
19th-century German painters
19th-century American male artists
German male painters
19th-century American painters
American male painters
People from Meissen